The Russian Revolution was a series of uprisings that led to the fall of the Russian Empire, the end of Russian involvement in the First World War (1914-1918), the Russian Civil War (1917-1923), and the establishment of the Union of Soviet Socialist Republics (USSR).

Russian Revolution may also refer to:
 1905 Russian Revolution, a failed uprising in the Russian Empire but with some reforms and lasting effects
 February Revolution (1917), the first phase of the Russian Revolution that led to the dissolution of the Russian Empire
 October Revolution (1917), the second phase of the Russian Revolution that established the Bolshevik communist regime
 The series of left-wing uprisings against the Bolsheviks, sometimes referred to as the Third Russian Revolution (after February and October 1917)
 1991 Soviet coup d'état attempt, popular resistance to the coup sometimes referred to as the Russian Revolution of 1991